Kwong On Bank Limited (KOB) was a Hong Kong-based bank. It was established in 1935 by Mr Leung Kwai-Yee and later run by his son, Dr. Leung Ding Bong, the President of the former Urban Council of Hong Kong, and Japan-based Fuji Bank, and his family. It was acquired and privatised by DBS Bank and renamed as DBS Kwong On Bank Limited in 1999. DBS Bank merged DBS Kwong On Bank, Dao Heng Bank and Overseas Trust Bank to form DBS Bank (Hong Kong) Limited in 2003.

See also 
DBS Bank (Hong Kong)
Dao Heng Bank
Overseas Trust Bank

References

Defunct banks of Hong Kong
DBS Bank
Companies formerly listed on the Hong Kong Stock Exchange
Banks disestablished in 2003
Banks established in 1935